Maggie's List is a United States federal political action committee founded in Florida in 2010 to "raise awareness and funds to increase the number of conservative women elected to federal public office."  It is named after Margaret Chase Smith, a Republican who was the first woman elected to both houses of Congress (elected to the House in 1940 and the Senate in 1948). Maggie's List first raised money and made donations to candidates in the 2010 elections.

See also
 EMILY's List, similar organization to help Democratic women in favor of abortion rights get elected
 Susan B. Anthony List – helps anti-abortion women get elected
 National Federation of Republican Women

References

External links
 

Organizations established in 2010
United States political action committees
Women's political advocacy groups in the United States
2010 establishments in Florida
Conservative organizations in the United States